Hitorigami (独神) are Shinto deities (kami) who came into being alone, as opposed to those who came into being as male-female pairs. According to the Kojiki, this group includes the "three deities of creation" and the "separate heavenly kami." They are described as hiding themselves away once they achieved awareness. Most are said to have been created from the "male essence" and, as such, are male in gender.

Two hitorigami, Kunitokotachi and Amenominakanushi, summoned the divine pair of Izanagi and Izanami into being and charged them with creating the first land in the swirling salt water that existed below the heavens.

List of Hitorigami 

Three Deities of Creation
Amenominakanushi
Takamimusuhi
Kamimusuhi

Separate Heavenly Kami
(partial list)
Umashiashikabihikoji
Amenotokotachi
Kunitokotachi
Toyokumonu

Notes 

Shinto kami